NK Trnje is a Croatian professional football club based in the city of Zagreb, founded in 1924. They currently play in the Treća HNL, the third division of Croatian football.

History
NK Trnje won the 2000-01 Treća HNL championship by six points, gaining promotion to the 2. HNL. However they finished 15th in their only season in the second division and were relegated.

Stadium
Their home stadium was built in 1980.

In 2017, the club constructed an auxiliary training field at the cost of 5 million kuna which meets the highest European standards.

Honours 
 Treća HNL – Center:
Winners (1): 2000–01

Current squad

References

Association football clubs established in 1924
Football clubs in Croatia
Football clubs in Zagreb
1924 establishments in Croatia